Eudianthe coeli-rosa, called the rose of heaven, is a flowering plant in the family Caryophyllaceae, native to the Canary Islands, Morocco, Algeria, Tunisia, Libya, Portugal, Spain, France (including Corsica), and Italy (including Sardinia and Sicily). An annual, it is grown in gardens as an ornamental.

References

Caryophyllaceae